William Joseph Robidoux (born January 13, 1964) is an American former professional baseball player, primarily at first base, but also occasionally played in the outfield and as a designated hitter.

Career
Drafted by the Milwaukee Brewers in the 6th round of the 1982 Major League Baseball Draft. Robidoux would make his Major League Baseball debut with the Milwaukee Brewers on September 11, 1985, playing with them until 1988, then signing as a free agent for the 1989 season with the Chicago White Sox. After one season with the White Sox he signed with the Boston Red Sox for the 1990 season. He appeared in his final game on September 17, 1990.

Robidoux now umpires high school baseball games in Western Massachusetts.

External links

1964 births
Living people
Águilas Cibaeñas players
American expatriate baseball players in the Dominican Republic
American expatriate baseball players in Canada
Baseball players from Massachusetts
Beloit Brewers players
Boston Red Sox players
Chicago White Sox players
Denver Zephyrs players
El Paso Diablos players
Major League Baseball designated hitters
Major League Baseball first basemen
Milwaukee Brewers players
Pawtucket Red Sox players
People from Ware, Massachusetts
Pikeville Brewers players
Stockton Ports players
Vancouver Canadians players